The 1628 Camarines earthquake struck Camarines, in the Philippines in 1628. Fourteen different shocks were recorded. The date is unknown. The United States' National Geophysical Data Center describes the damage as "severe" and the total number of homes damaged as "many".

See also
List of earthquakes in the Philippines
List of  historical earthquakes

References

1628 earthquakes
Earthquakes in the Philippines
History of Camarines Norte
History of Camarines Sur
1628 in Southeast Asia